Two ships of the United States Navy have borne the name USS Strong, in honor of Rear Admiral James H. Strong (1814–1882), who distinguished himself at the Battle of Mobile Bay.

United States Navy ship names